Belford railway station may refer to:

 Belford railway station, New South Wales
 Belford railway station (England), a former station on the East Coast Main Line in Northumberland